This article is about the particular significance of the year 1899 to Wales and its people.

Incumbents

Archdruid of the National Eisteddfod of Wales – Hwfa Môn

Lord Lieutenant of Anglesey – Sir Richard Henry Williams-Bulkeley, 12th Baronet  
Lord Lieutenant of Brecknockshire – Joseph Bailey, 1st Baron Glanusk
Lord Lieutenant of Caernarvonshire – John Ernest Greaves
Lord Lieutenant of Cardiganshire – Herbert Davies-Evans
Lord Lieutenant of Carmarthenshire – Sir James Williams-Drummond, 4th Baronet
Lord Lieutenant of Denbighshire – William Cornwallis-West    
Lord Lieutenant of Flintshire – Hugh Robert Hughes 
Lord Lieutenant of Glamorgan – Robert Windsor-Clive, 1st Earl of Plymouth
Lord Lieutenant of Merionethshire – W. R. M. Wynne 
Lord Lieutenant of Monmouthshire – Henry Somerset, 8th Duke of Beaufort (until 30 April); Godfrey Morgan, 1st Viscount Tredegar (from 23 June)
Lord Lieutenant of Montgomeryshire – Sir Herbert Williams-Wynn, 7th Baronet 
Lord Lieutenant of Pembrokeshire – Frederick Campbell, 3rd Earl Cawdor
Lord Lieutenant of Radnorshire – Powlett Milbank

Bishop of Bangor – Watkin Williams (from 2 February) 
Bishop of Llandaff – Richard Lewis
Bishop of St Asaph – A. G. Edwards (later Archbishop of Wales) 
Bishop of St Davids – John Owen

Events
25 January – Adelina Patti marries her third husband, Baron Rolf Cederström, in a Roman Catholic service at Brecon.
20 March – W. H. Davies, "tramp-poet", loses his foot trying to jump a freight train at Renfrew, Ontario.
29 March – A French barque, Le Maréchal Lannes, is wrecked off Grassholm, with the loss of its crew of 25.
April – The Duke and Duchess of York visit Gwydir Castle.
23 May – William Goscombe John's statue of "The Little Girl" at Llansannan is unveiled by Mrs Herbert Roberts.
20 July – A rabid dog attacks a group of children in Pontarddulais. In August, eight of them are sent to the Pasteur Institute in Paris to be inoculated.
2 September – Arthur Wade-Evans takes the surname "Wade-Evans" by deed poll.
date unknown
Businessman Arthur Keen buys the Dowlais Iron Company from Ivor Bertie Guest, 1st Baron Wimborne.
The George Hotel, Chepstow, is rebuilt. 
Explorer Henry Morton Stanley is knighted.
In the United States, J. Vyrnwy Morgan, pastor of the First Baptist Church at Omaha, Nebraska, relocates to Denver, Colorado, for the sake of his wife's health. (She dies on New Year's Day 1900.)

Arts and literature

Awards
National Eisteddfod of Wales – held at Cardiff
Chair – withheld
Crown – R. Gwylfa Roberts, "Y Diddanydd Arall"

New books

English language
Rhoda Broughton – Foes in Law
Allen Raine – By Berwyn Banks
William Retlaw Jefferson Williams – The Parliamentary History of Oxford, 1213-1899

Welsh language
John Hughes – Ysgol Jacob
Daniel Evan Jones – Hanes Plwyf Llangeler a Phenboyr
John Owen Jones (Ap Ffarmwr) – Cofiant Gladstone
James Morris – Cofiant Thomas Jones, Conwyl

Music
11 March – The Gramophone Company makes the first recording in the Welsh language, including Madge Breese singing Hen wlad fy nhadau.

Works
Walford Davies – Overture, A Welshman in London

Sport
Football
The Welsh Cup is won by the "Druids" for the seventh time in its 21-year history.
Cardiff City F.C. is founded, under the name of "Riverside Reserves".
Yachting – The River Towy Yacht Club is founded.

Births
18 February – Mervyn Johns, actor (died 1992)
8 March – Eric Linklater, writer (died 1974)
30 March – Cyril Radcliffe, lawyer and public servant involved in the Partition of India (died 1977)
14 April – Arthur Owens, intelligence agent (died 1957)
28 April – Len Davies, footballer (died 1945)
17 May – H. H. Price, philosopher (died 1984)
18 May
Ronald Armstrong-Jones, barrister (died 1966)
David James Jones (Gwenallt), poet (died 1968)
16 June – Jack Gore, Wales international rugby player (died 1971)
15 July – Idris Cox, political activist (died 1989)
16 July – Ernie Finch, Wales international rugby player (died 1983)
12 December – Charlie Jones, footballer (died 1966)
20 December – Martyn Lloyd-Jones, preacher (died 1981)

Deaths
9 January – Harry Congreve Evans, Australian journalist of Welsh descent, 38
4 February – William Hughes, Welsh-born US politician, 57 
2 March – John Owen Jones (Ap Ffarmwr), journalist, 38
22 March – Tom Morgan Wales international rugby player, 32
5 April 
T. E. Ellis, politician, 40
Richard P. Howell, Welsh-born US carpenter, businessman, and politician, 67
16 April – William Roberts, physician, 69
19 May – Elias Owen, clergyman and antiquarian, 65
4 August – Daniel Lewis Lloyd, bishop and academic, 55
18 August – Nicholas Bennett, historian, 76
28 August – Owen Glynne Jones, mountaineer, 31
9 September – William Pamplin, English-born botanist, 93
13 October – Charles Ashton, literary historian, 51 (suicide)
18 November – Henry Hicks, geologist, 62
23 November – Dai St. John, heavyweight boxer, 28
11 December – Stephen W. Williams, civil engineer and architect, 62

References

Wales
 Wales